Jyoti Kumar Sinha was born in Patna, Bihar. He served as Director General of Central Reserve Police Force and later as Member of the National Disaster Management Authority and RAW chief. He is a Bihar cadre Indian Police Service officer of the 1967 batch.

Early life
J.K. Sinha completed his schooling from St. Xavier's High School, Patna and then graduated with Honours in History from Patna College. He joined the Indian Police Service in 1967 following in the footsteps of his father and grand father. His grandfather, late Shri A.K. Sinha, was the first Indian to become IG of Police, Bihar way back in 1939. J.K. Sinha's father was also an IP officer who also rose to head Bihar Police as IG.

Awards 
In 2019, he received the Padma Sri honour for his contribution in the field of social work.

==References==

Living people
Indian police chiefs
People from Patna
St. Xavier's Patna alumni
People of the Research and Analysis Wing
Year of birth missing (living people)
Recipients of the Padma Shri in social work